A military dictatorship is a type of dictatorship in which power is held by one or more military officers acting on behalf of the military. Military dictatorships are led by either a single military dictator, known as a strongman, or by a council of military officers known as a military junta. They are most often formed by military coups or the empowerment of the military through a popular uprising in times of domestic unrest or instability. The military nominally seeks power to restore order or fight corruption, but the personal motivations of military officers may include greater funding for the military or a decrease in civilian control of the military.

The balance of power in a military dictatorship depends on the dictator's ability to maintain the approval of the military through concessions and appeasement while using force to repress opposition. Military strongmen may seek to consolidate power independently of the military, effectively creating personalist dictatorships. Military dictators are under constant threat of removal by their fellow military officers, and counter-coups are common against military regimes that fail to maintain support. Politicization of the military can also cause factionalism, and the military is often willing to give up power voluntarily rather than have the military destabilized. Military dictatorships are often less involved in political affairs than other regimes, with their policy mainly directed toward benefiting the military as an institution. Military rule is maintained by force more so than in other regimes, though military dictators often create separate security forces to maintain political control independently from the military.

Early military dictatorships existed in post-classical Asia, including military leaders in Korea and Japan. Modern military dictatorship developed in Latin America during the 19th century, and it further developed in Europe during the early-20th century. Military dictatorship saw a resurgence during the Cold War with new military dictatorships being established in Africa, Asia, and Latin America in the 1960s. The number of military dictatorships declined in the 1970s and 1980s, and the end of the Cold War saw the dissolution of most military dictatorships. Few military dictatorships exist in the 21st century, and they are virtually nonexistent outside of Africa and Southeast Asia.

Formation

Formation process 

Most military dictatorships are formed after a coup d'état has overthrown the previous government. These coups typically take place when there is a perceived threat to the military or its interests as an institution, including cuts to military funding or civilian interference in military affairs. Military officers have a vested interest in having increased pay and benefits while preventing political intervention in promotions, and failure to address these issues may cause interest in military regime change. These coups are most common in the developing world, where a lack of democracy often necessitates such events for changes in leadership.

Not all dictatorships taken through military force are military dictatorships, for in many cases a civilian dictator will take power following a coup and relegate military officers. In some cases, the military may be invested with dictatorial powers during a popular uprising. The military is well-equipped to seek and maintain political power, as it is often more modernized than other institutions in a given country, with access to resources and training not available to civil leaders.

A regime can also be formed by an insurgency, or an informal group of militants that attempt to seize power in a government. When insurgents form a dictatorship, they are not constrained by formal military procedures, but their lack of organization can increase the likelihood of opposing factions developing within the group. Insurgencies sometimes grant military titles to their leaders, but they do not adopt the structure of a true military. Regimes created by insurgencies may or may not be recognized as military dictatorships.

Factors 
The military's purpose in a given country may affect whether it attempts to seize power. When international opponents prompt stronger national defense, a military is more likely to comply with a civilian government, as the civilian government is likely to provide for the military. Neighboring countries that present territorial threats have the effect of harming democracy and incentivizing the creation of a stronger military, which both increase the likelihood of a military dictatorship. All of these factors are aggravated in countries with significant natural resources, as these provide an additional incentive for the military to seize power. Military dictatorships almost universally form in peacetime, with Turkey under Mustafa Kemal Atatürk being the only notable exception by 1980.

The nature of the preceding government is also a factor in whether a military dictatorship forms. Democracies are most at risk of becoming military dictatorships shortly after their formation. When a new democracy is formed, the government's institutions are fragile and civil government may not have organized its control over the military. Oligarchies prevent military dictatorships by maintaining an equilibrium, keeping the military strong enough to maintain the oligarchy while providing incentives to encourage loyalty.

The risk assessment process for military officers considering dictatorial rule is distinct from that of other potential dictators. Military officers engaging in a coup face lower risks compared to other attempts to establish dictatorships, as most officers are often allowed to retain their positions if the dictatorship does not survive, with only the military dictator and the highest ranking officers facing significant risk. Instead, officers in professionalized militaries will consider the risk to the military in its entirety rather than their individual risk, as institutional risk is much higher.

Some factors can mitigate the change of a military dictatorship forming, and these may be implemented in regions where military dictatorships are common. Constitutional provisions may be enacted to enforce penalties for military officers involved in coups, alternate military bodies may be created that do not answer to the army, military officers may be given positions in civil government, or the military may be reduced in size and resources. Such measures have had mixed success.

Justification 
To establish legitimacy, a military dictatorship will often present itself as saving the nation from the corrupt or myopic civilian politicians, justifying its position as "neutral" arbiters on the basis of their membership within the armed forces, which in many countries are nominally expected to be apolitical institutions. Military rulers will often justify their intervention as acting on behalf of politically repressed citizens or as a response to economic failure.

Several justifications may be offered by military leadership for seizing power, including improper behavior of the civilian government, a threat of communist takeover, or disorder in politics. These justifications are often given for any formation of military rule, even if the personal motivations of the officers involve greed, ambition, factionalism, or ethnic conflict. An increase of the military budget is a common goal across regimes. In some cases, a military dictatorship may be seen as a measure of last resort, in which an active or former military officer will be asked to seize power to end the rule of a worse government, though it is not necessarily the case that a military dictatorship brings about the promised improvement and stability.

Stability

Duration 

The duration and stability of military dictatorships vary considerably, even within a single region, and military dictatorships are generally less stable than other regimes. The average military dictatorship lasts only five years, and the average military dictator is only in power for three years. Military dictatorships struggle to build support through mass political participation or a partisan apparatus, which limits the ability for a regime to establish a stable long-term government. When military dictators are toppled, they are often succeeded by further military coups and new military dictators seizing power within the dictatorship. An example of this was the series of coups and counter-coup attempts witnessed in Syria following the 1963 coup d'etat by the Military Committe of Arab Socialist Ba'ath Party that continued until the 1970 coup by General Hafez al-Assad. The most immediate threats to military dictators are the military officers that they depend on, making long term stability difficult. 

Individual military dictators become more secure as they spend more time in office, as they are able to shift power away from military institutions by creating civilian and paramilitary forces to keep them in check. Dictators that do not create these institutions are often removed more quickly. Highly professional militaries with coherence and discipline benefit from sharing power between military officers, while less professional militaries often find it necessary to build support among the civilian government. Less professional militaries are less stable, meaning they are more prone to corruption and more likely to consolidate power.

Causes of dissolution 

Military dictatorships are unique among regime types in that those in power often do not wish to remain so. Many military officers will choose to end the military's involvement in politics if it appears to be having a negative effect on the military's cohesion, its legitimacy, or its interests. When politicization leads to factionalism, in can weaken the military's hold on power and discourage leaders from further political involvement. Military rulers are more likely to negotiate and relinquish power willingly than other dictators, as no opposing armed group exists to take power by force, and they typically have the option to return to military life and would rather preserve the military as an institution than risk its destruction in civil conflict. The legitimacy of a military dictatorship is often contingent on the promise to step down once conditions have been established for a civilian government, and resistance can form against a regime that holds power beyond this point. A prosperous military dictatorship will see increasing calls to restore civilian government as the economy improves.

Military dictatorships are most commonly dissolved following a poor performance in the opinion of elites, causing them to revoke their support for the regime. Civilian demonstrations and strikes rarely have a significant effect on military rule, and any affect they do have is often indirect. Civilian use of force through armed insurgency can destabilize a military dictatorship, though these are rare. Foreign influence is a common means to end military dictatorship, and powerful countries can often end a military regime by exerting diplomatic and economic pressure. This often takes place when it takes actions that harm the foreign government or engages in widespread human rights abuses. Foreign countries may also resort to military invasion to end the rule of a military dictator.

Democratization 

As authoritarian regimes, military dictatorships depend on the restriction of democracy to retain power. The centralization of power and the restriction of liberties such as freedom of speech and due process prevent democratic institutions from developing. Despite these restrictions, military dictatorships are more likely to democratize than other forms of dictatorship, particularly if power has not consolidated in the hands of a single officer. Public support for democracy is taken more seriously by military dictatorships than in other regimes, and public unrest may prompt a military dictatorship to initiate democratization. Human development is correlated with a society's capacity and desire for democracy, and in turn, with a military regime's willingness to relinquish power. Urbanization and industrialization support the creation of a middle class that is better equipped for civic engagement. Democratization in regions with lower human development often result in joint civilian-military governance.

The implementation of civilian government does not necessarily lead to democracy, as the military may continue to exert influence and rule in tandem with civilian leadership. Following democratization, a civilian government is immediately faced with the issue of military regulation and to establish civilian control of the military. Such policies must be implemented in a way that does not threaten the military or make the government appear unstable so as to avoid provoking further military intervention. The militarization of police can create long term stability issues after democratization, as military and civilian policing are not immediately compatible. The abolition of military police creates separate issues as it effectively creates mass unemployment of individuals trained in violence. Democracies borne from military dictatorships typically have higher homicide rates than those of other democracies.

Structure

Government positions 

The organization of power in a military dictatorship is heavily influenced by the chain of command used in militaries. The dictator in a military dictatorship is typically the highest ranking officer among those involved in a coup, and the hierarchical structure of a military lends itself to efficient control in a dictatorship led by military officers. The military dictator often holds strong control over the regional leaders that they appoint, as they are subject to the dictator's orders under the chain of command. Junior officers sometimes take power through a military coup, often when factionalism has broken down the traditional command structure, and most coups led by junior officers defer to senior officers after seizing power. 

The inner circle that carries out the dictator's orders in a military dictatorship is made up of other military officers. These officers are responsible for representing the forces under their command in the government and maintaining their loyalty to the regime. Military dictators are often limited in choosing their inner circle, as they are expected to comply with standard procedure for military promotion. As these officers have control over large numbers of soldiers and weapons, dictators have strong incentive to appease them, and they can serve as a constraining force on the dictator. In some cases, military officers may be pressured to retire from the military upon taking power, limiting their ability to control military promotions and postings while ruling as dictator. The need to consider the wishes of soldiers and officers causes policy in a military dictatorship to heavily favor the military, including increased military spending and other benefits for enlisted members.

Civilians are subject to the decisions of military leadership, typically without any role in decision making, and force is used to ensure compliance. Civilian presence in the government is sometimes used to create legitimacy, though this varies between regimes. The military may rule through a civilian government, or there may be no civilian presence in the government at all. Military dictators may also attempt to shift power toward a civilian or party-controlled government over which they have more personal control. A stable civilian bureaucracy is necessary for long term success of a military dictatorship, as military officers often lack the political skills necessary to maintain a government. Skilled civilians may be given significant positions in an otherwise military-controlled government, but they are subject to the wishes of the military. Some military dictatorships appoint representatives that nominally serve as the civilian voice in government, but these individuals are selected by the military without any input from the people.

Classification 

Different definitions and criteria may be used to determine whether a government constitutes a military dictatorship. Some scholars may classify any authoritarian regime led by a military officer as a military dictatorship, while stricter definitions may require certain standards of the military as a professionalized institution. Some dictatorships may blend elements of different classifications, allowing for military dictatorships to also be personalist or one-party dictatorships. Military dictatorships can be further classified as military juntas, in which power is shared by military officers, or as military strongmen, in which power is held by a single military dictator.

A military junta is a type of leadership structure in a military dictatorship in which a committee of military officers rules in unison. The junta typically includes the leader of each branch of the military and sometimes the state police. Many juntas present themselves as restorers of peace, adopting titles along the lines of "Committee of National Restoration", or "National Liberation Committee". Juntas often appoint one member as the head, effectively designating that person the dictator. Officers working alongside this dictator wield considerable political power. The military structure provides stability for such a government, as officers have effective control over their subordinates and can bargain on their behalf. Factionalism can threaten the junta structure, as it incentivizes lower-ranked officers to change their loyalties.

Strongmen are dictators that rule as both military dictators and personalist dictators. They seize power and rule through the military, but they do not meaningfully share their power with the military, ruling unilaterally. These dictatorships become increasingly personalist as the ruler consolidates power and subjugates rivals, eventually culminating in cults of personality. Other military officers may hold positions in the government, but they have no power to restrain the dictator or influence policy decisions. A military dictator becomes a strongman by securing control of state security forces, allowing the dictator to coerce other officers. Military dictators that seek to personalize their rule must bypass the higher-ranked officers that make up the inner circle, negotiating with the lower-ranked officers directly. Achieving direct control over the military also allows the dictator to appoint loyalists to important positions while excluding competitors. Military officers will often demand that the dictator give up their military rank upon taking power for this reason.

Politics 
Military dictatorships vary greatly in how they function, what ideologies they proclaim, and what policies they enforce. The level of direct military involvement in governance depends on how the military institution is structured. In some cases, the military may be unable to have its interests heard, depending on how integrated the military is with state actors and whether power is divided among military officers. Similar to absolute monarchies, military dictatorships traditionally adhere to a classical conception of dictatorship that rejects partisan politics and allows other institutions, such as churches, to exist and hold power. This is contrasted with totalitarianism, which engages in control of all ideological and social elements within the dictatorship.

Factions are less likely to form along ideological lines among elites within military dictatorships, as military officers are more likely to be aligned in policy preferences and to prioritize military unity, allowing for more efficient implementation of policy. Military training often emphasizes unity and cohesiveness within the military. These ideas are reinforced by coordinated action through training and military operations, and factionalism is subject to increase when militaries are not actively engaged in these and there is not a clear objective. Factionalism affects most military dictatorships, particularly if the regime fails to perform adequately in the eyes of the regime's elites.

Many dictators have chosen to emphasize their strength by incorporating military tradition into their personal styles, such as including military ranks in their formal titles and wearing military uniforms. While common among military dictators, these strategies have also been used by civilian dictators. Other military dictators have avoided demonstrating their allegiance to the military by dressing in civilian clothes and removing their military ranks so as to invoke the legitimacy of a civilian government. Militarism among dictators has become less common in the 21st century as dictators have emphasized public approval over ruling through fear.

Policy development and implementation 
Military dictatorships may rule directly, implementing a specific ideology and vision, or they may rule as arbitrators that see themselves as protectors of the nation and the government. These arbitrator dictatorships tend only to last until civilian government can be restored, while direct rulers seek to consolidate their own power and reject civilian rule as inferior. Policies of a military dictatorship are made through decree from military leadership and enforced by the military in its entirety, sometimes without warning or advance notice. The motivations of the military are often different than that of other rulers in dictatorships. Members of the military are typically concerned with the preservation of the military rather than seeking power for its own sake. As such, internal divisions in the military are often seen as a greater threat than external forces. Though approximately half of dictatorships hold unfair elections to consolidate power, military dictatorships are less likely to do so, with less than one quarter of military dictatorships holding elections.

Policy goals in a military dictatorship are rarely organized, preventing a regime from implementing policies and programs with a clear objective. Policy choices often differ from those of other dictatorships, particularly in areas of war and political opposition. Military regimes are generally independent from special interests and have no allegiance to any particular social class, as the military is its own institution with competing interests among its members. Military dictators have no unifying ideology, and they may enforce left-wing politics or right-wing politics.

Use of force 

Military dictatorships rely disproportionately on force relative to other dictatorships, as the individuals running the government are more experienced in military means than political or diplomatic means. Military officers are more inclined to view foreign relations as confrontational than diplomatic for the same reason. Military activity is seen as routine, and military dictators are less likely to ascribe high cost to the use of military force. Conversely, diplomacy is seen as higher cost as it may strengthen civilian control of the military. Threats issued by military dictatorships are generally seen as more credible than those of other regimes, but they are less likely to escalate into conflict.

Military dictatorships may still be challenged by inefficient police forces, as the military structure must be repurposed for internal suppression and soldiers are often unwilling to fight unarmed civilians. Officers may also be reluctant to engage in domestic operations. Paramilitary forces and civilian police forces are often created under military dictatorships to supplement the military for these reasons. Human rights violations and state-sanctioned atrocities in military dictatorships are often carried out by these non-military security forces rather than by the military itself.

Despite the heavy influence of military tradition, however, military dictatorships are not necessarily more militaristic or more prone to external conflict. The use of military force internally restricts the ability to project it externally, and vice versa. As military dictatorships depend on internal use of the military, few military dictatorships maintain combat readiness for conflicts with other countries. The use of the military as an oppressive force reduces civilian support for militarism, resulting in fewer willing enlistments and less war effort collaboration between civilians and the military during times of conflict. The politicization of the military introduces further weakness into the military as a means of projecting power, as officers are often in political conflict with one another at the expense of the soldiers under their command. At the same time, these factors may increase the risk of civil conflict.

History

Early military dictatorships 

An early military dictatorship formed in Korea under the Goguryeo kingdom in 642 under military leader Yeon Gaesomun. Yeon took absolute power after having the monarch killed and placing another member of the royal family on the throne as a figurehead. Another military dictatorship developed in Korea in 1170 when the military officers of the Goryeo dynasty revolted against the expansion of civil service at the expense of the military. The monarch was again replaced with a relative to serve as a figurehead, and a series of military officers ruled over the Goryeo military regime as they sought to undermine and seize power from one another. Power was consolidated by Choe Chung-heon through a coup in 1196, and his descendants would rule until 1258.

Japan was ruled by a series of military rulers called shoguns, beginning with the formation of the Kamakura shogunate in 1185. While shoguns nominally operated under the Emperor of Japan, they served as de facto rulers of Japan and the Japanese military. Japan was ruled by shoguns until the fall of the Meiji Restoration that brought about the fall of the Tokugawa shogunate in 1868. During the Lê dynasty of Vietnam between the 16th and 18th centuries, the country was under de facto military rule by two rival military families: the Trịnh lords in the north and the Nguyễn lords in the south. 

The Commonwealth of England under Oliver Cromwell, formed in 1649 after the Second English Civil War, has been described as a military dictatorship by its contemporary opponents and by some modern academics.

19th century and World Wars 

Latin America was the only region of the world where military dictatorships were common in the 19th century. The Spanish American wars of independence took place in the early-19th century, creating many new Latin American governments. Many of these governments fell under the control of caudillos, or personalist dictators. Most caudillos came from a military background, and their rule was typically associated with pageantry and glamor. Caudillos were often nominally constrained by a constitution, but the caudillo had the power to draft a new constitution as he wished. Many are noted for their cruelty, while others are honored as national heroes. Dictatorships in Latin America persisted into the 20th century, and further military coups established new regimes, often in the name of nationalism.

Several military dictatorships developed in Eastern Europe during the interwar period. The rule of Józef Piłsudski in Poland developed in the style of a Latin American dictatorship with a military coup and a brief armed conflict, but it became significantly more militant than other military dictatorships due to the perceived threat from the surrounding great powers. Power was willingly transferred to the military by Carol I of Romania, establishing Ion Antonescu as a military dictator styled as a "Conducător".

Postwar military dictatorships 
Widespread attention to military dictatorship as a form of government developed in the 1960s as various militaries seized power in several countries, particularly in South America. Early study focused extensively on what caused military dictatorships. The Cold War caused a surge in military dictatorships, as both the Western Bloc and the Eastern Bloc tolerated military regimes that promised stability, and both supported regime change against those that did not.

Reactionary military dictatorships were common during the Cold War, with dictators that maintained support among the middle class and upper class by implementing economic reforms and strengthening the dictatorship's stance in international economics. Prominent examples included Chile under Augusto Pinochet and Greece under the Greek junta. In Latin America, 17 of 20 countries experienced reactionary military dictatorship at some point between World War II and the end of the Cold War. Some reformist military dictatorships also existed at this time, maintaining popular support by appealing to labor groups and the working class. Argentina under Juan Perón was the most prominent of these, though other examples of reformist militarism occurred in this period, including in Egypt under Gamal Abdel Nasser and Portugal under the Armed Forces Movement.

A global reversal of military dictatorships began in the 1970s and 1980s when militaries increasingly gave up power in favor of civilian rule. At the end of the Cold War, the fall of the Eastern Bloc reduced the amount of support given to military dictatorships and gave the Western Bloc wider latitude to challenge authoritarianism in military dictatorships. Since then, the global community has taken a stronger stance against military dictatorships and other forms of undemocratic government. Military coups are virtually nonexistent outside of Africa in the 21st century, with Myanmar being the only exception between 2017 and 2022.

Africa 
Military dictatorships were one of the two regime types that became common in Africa after decolonization in the 1960s through the 1980s, alongside one-party states. At the time of decolonization, no meaningful institutions or national identity existed to maintain democracy or economic growth. Due to the colonial history of African nations and the higher frequency of civil than external conflict, militaries in sub-Saharan Africa have struggled to develop as institutions, allowing military dictatorships in Africa to more easily become personalist dictatorships. Military oppression had been a common occurrence under colonial rule, and military institutions in Africa were already predisposed to internal control. Several African military dictators, such as Hamani Diori of Niger, Jean-Bédel Bokassa of the Central African Republic, and Idi Amin of Uganda, were at one point involved with colonial militaries. Ethnic conflict has also prompted military officers to carry out regime change, particularly among post-colonial nations where the military and the civilian government had different ethnic makeups.

Between 1959 and 2001, 14 African countries experienced at least three successful military coups. Nigeria was particularly affected, with six military dictators between two separate regimes. The military dictatorship in Nigeria was one of the most prominent in Africa, forming shortly after independence and persisting for most of the century thereafter. By 1975, half of African countries were subject to military rule. Many African militaries traditionally saw themselves as guardians that oversaw the nation, intervening when civilian government exerted authority over the military. Other military dictatorships in Africa sought power simply to provide advantages for its members and its political interests. African military dictators often seized power citing a failure of civilian government, banning all political activity and suspending the constitution. In many cases, former military dictators in Africa would later seek election as civilian rulers. Several African military dictators nominally adopted socialist messaging to gain support from neighboring one-party socialist dictatorships.

Public rejection of military dictatorship significantly increased in the 1980s as pro-democracy protests took place across Africa. Democratization of military dictatorships became more common by 1995, when approximately half of the countries in Africa were democracies. Several of the surviving military dictatorships in Africa also enacted measures to increase citizen participation in local governance. Instances of military dictatorships challenging democracy continued, however, with several military governments cancelling elections and overthrowing democratic governments in the 1990s. As of 2023, Africa is the only continent that sees regular military coups.

East and Southeast Asia 

South Korea became a military dictatorship following the May 16 coup in 1961, following years of military buildup and involvement of the military in politics. To maintain power, the military organized the Democratic Republican Party to hold political power after nominally returning to civilian government in 1963. A series of military dictators ruled until democratization in 1987, though the military remained influential in politics thereafter.

Indonesia underwent a long military dictatorship under the New Order of Suharto from 1968 to 1999. This dictatorship introduced some liberal reforms and saw relative stability until unrest caused by the 1997 Asian financial crisis. Myanmar has become an exception among military dictatorships for its long military rule, and it has been recognized as "the most durable military regime worldwide". The military first seized power from 1958–1960 and again from 1962–2011, then maintaining indirect rule before seizing control a third time in 2021. Neighboring Thailand has seen a similar trend, where the military has ruled directly or indirectly for most years since 1932, with only four civilian governments being formed between 1932 and 2011.

Europe 
In 1967, the military of Greece seized power with the stated intention of ending corruption and demagoguery. The Greek junta ruled until 1974, at which point a political crisis prompted by the Cyprus problem convinced the military to return power to the previous civilian government. In 1981, General Wojciech Jaruzelski of Poland became first secretary of the Polish United Workers' Party, the ruling party of Poland's one-party dictatorship. Two months later, he proclaimed martial law, putting the country under military rule and replacing a one-party dictatorship with a military dictatorship. Martial law ended in 1983, but Jaruzelski retained political power.

Latin America 
Argentina was particularly susceptible to military dictatorship during the Cold War, with ten separate military dictators ruling across four different regimes between 1943 and 1983. Brazil and Guatemala also saw five and six separate military dictators, respectively. The military dictatorship in Brazil was unique both in that it lasted nearly 20 years and that it allowed elections with competing political parties. El Salvador became a dictatorship in 1931, becoming a rare example of a partisan military dictatorship. The country was ruled by the military-run National Pro Patria Party from 1933 to 1944, the Revolutionary Party of Democratic Unification from 1950 to 1960, and the National Conciliation Party from 1962 to 1979.

Military dictatorship resurged in Latin America in the 1960s, with unstable economic conditions allowing military juntas to take power. Between 1967 and 1991, 12 Latin American countries underwent at least one military coup, with Haiti and Honduras experiencing three and Bolivia experiencing eight. A large wave of military dictatorships occurred in the 1970s, and most of Latin America was under the rule of military dictatorships by the middle of the decade. Foreign aid to support Latin American militaries was one factor that allowed further military coups, and the political polarization of the Cold War played a role in creating the political instability that incentivized military rule.

Foreign pressure, particularly from the Carter administration in the United States, prompted the end of several military dictatorships in the region in the late 1970s. Several Latin American countries began to democratize by the early-1980s, and the number of coups declined as well. Military dictatorship had virtually disappeared in Latin America by the end of the Cold War. The Argentine Carapintadas were unable to seize power in 1990 because there was strong public opposition to military rule. By the time of the 2009 Honduran coup, such events were considered unusual in the region.

Muslim world 
In the Muslim world, a form of Islamic military dictatorship developed in Libya and Pakistan. Pakistan presented an example of a dictatorship that was equally military and personalist, in which General Muhammad Zia-ul-Haq ruled as a personalist dictator but incorporated the military into civil government. Yemen was divided by military rule and one-party rule until the military-ruled Yemen Arab Republic seized control of the entire nation in the Yemeni Civil War of 1994. Several Middle Eastern countries were the subject of military coups in the 1950s and 1960s, including Iraq, Syria, North Yemen, and South Yemen. Military coups have since been rare in the Middle East with the exceptions of Iraq and Turkey.

See also
 Civil–military relations
 Films depicting Latin American military dictatorships
 List of political leaders who held active military ranks in office
 Military rule (disambiguation)
 Stratocracy

References

Bibliography 
 
 
 
 
 
 
 
 
 

 
Constitutional state types
Military sociology
Civil–military relations